The Address Supporting Organization (ASO) is a supporting organization affiliated with ICANN. It was founded in 1999. Its members make up the Address Council.  The ASO's web site states that the ASO's purpose "is to review and develop recommendations on Internet Protocol (IP) address policy and to advise the ICANN Board."

The ASO is made of up of representatives from each of the five regional internet registries. It nominates two members of the ICANN board of directors.

External links 
 Official site
 Address Supporting Organization: About the ASO

International telecommunications
Organizations established in 1999
Internet governance organizations

de:Internet Corporation for Assigned Names and Numbers#Address Supporting Organization